Mathias Fink, born in 1945 in Grenoble, is a French physicist, professor at ESPCI Paris and member of the French Academy of Sciences.

Life and career 
Mathias Fink received a M.S. degree in mathematics from Paris University, and the Ph.D. degree in solid state physics. Then he moved to medical imaging and received the Doctorat es-Sciences degree from Paris University in the area of ultrasonic focusing for real-time medical imaging under the direction of Pierre Alais (1978). 

In 1981 he was appointed Professor at the University of Strasbourg. After a stay as a visiting professor at the University of Irvine in the radiology department he returned to France to become professor at the Paris Diderot University (Paris 7). In 1990 and founded the "Waves and Acoustics Laboratory" at ESPCI whose director he was and which became the Institut Langevin in 2009. 2005 he was appointed professor at ESPCI, where he now is professor emeritus and holds the Georges Charpak chair. 

Fink pioneered the development of time-reversal mirrors and Time Reversal Signal Processing. He developed many applications of this concept from ultrasound therapy, medical imaging, non-destructive testing, underwater acoustics, seismic imaging, tactile objects, to electromagnetic telecommunications.
He also pioneered innovative medical imaging methods: transient elastography, supersonic shear imaging and multi-wave imaging that are now implemented by several companies. Six companies with close to 400 employees have been created from his research: Echosens, Sensitive Object, Supersonic Imagine, Time Reversal Communications, Cardiawave, and GreenerWave.

Honors and awards  
 1994 Grand prix de la créativité SNECMA
 1995 Foucault prize of the French Physical Society
 2002 elected to the French Academy of Engineering
 2003 elected to the French Academy of Science
 2006 Helmholtz-Rayleigh Interdisciplinary Silver Medal of the Acoustical Society of America
 2007 Officer of the French Legion (since 2017 Commander)
 2008 Louis Néel prize of the French Physical Society
 2008/2009 Liliane Bettencourt Chair of Technological Innovation at the Collège de France
 2015 international colloquium in honor of his 70th birthday

Selected works

References

External links 

 

1945 births
French physicists
Members of the French Academy of Sciences

Commandeurs of the Légion d'honneur
Living people
Academic staff of ESPCI Paris